Streeck or van Streeck is a surname. Notable people with the surname include: 

Hendrick van Streeck (1659-1720), Dutch Golden Age painter 
Hendrik Streeck (born 1977), German epidemiologist
Juriaen van Streeck (1632–1687), Dutch Golden Age painter
Wolfgang Streeck (born 1946), German economic sociologist